Mesfin Hagos (born 1947) is an Eritrean who was one of the founding members of the Eritrean People's Liberation Front (EPLF). In government, he was the Eritrean Minister of Defense during the 1990s. After repression by president Isaias Afwerki against Mesfin's colleagues, Mesfin sought political asylum in Germany in 2013, where he lived .

Childhood and education
Mesfin was born in Azien, Eritrea on 21 November 19

47.

Rebel fighter
Mesfin was a founding member of the Eritrean People's Liberation Front (EPLF) in 1977. Before founding that organization, he had joined the Eritrean Liberation Front (ELF) in 1966 as an ordinary member. He eventually became Deputy Commander of ELF Zone 5.

Mesfin Hagos left the ELF in 1970 with Isaias Afwerki, Major General Asmerom Gerezgiher, Solomon Weldemariam, and Tewelde Eyob. Hagos was a part of the founding leadership of the EPLF. Mesfin Hagos briefly served as the Chief of Staff in the EPLF. He was one of the commanders of the Battle of Af'abet that destroyed the backbone of the Ethiopian army.

Government
Mesfin served as the defence minister of Eritrea in the 1990s.

Exile
Mesfin later started opposing Afwerki's dictatorial rule and, in 2013, sought asylum in Germany after his colleagues opposing the President were hunted down. , Mesfin lived in Germany.

References

1947 births
Eritrean military personnel
Living people
Government ministers of Eritrea
Eritrean People's Liberation Front members